Mark Edward Mahowald (December 1, 1931 – July 20, 2013) was an American mathematician known for work in algebraic topology.

Life
Mahowald was born in Albany, Minnesota in 1931. He received his Ph.D. from the University of Minnesota in 1955 under the direction of Bernard Russell Gelbaum with a thesis on Measure in Groups. In the sixties, he became professor at Syracuse University and around 1963 he went to Northwestern University in Evanston, Illinois.

Work
Much of Mahowald's most important works concerns the homotopy groups of spheres, especially using the Adams spectral sequence at the prime 2. In addition, he made extensive computations of the structure of the Adams spectral sequence and the 2-primary stable homotopy groups of spheres up to dimension 64 together with Michael Barratt, Martin Tangora, and Stanley Kochman. Using these computations, he could show that a manifold of Kervaire invariant 1 exists in dimension 62.

In addition, he contributed to the chromatic picture of the homotopy groups of spheres: His earlier work contains much on the image of the J-homomorphism and recent work together with Paul Goerss, Hans-Werner Henn, Nasko Karamanov, and Charles Rezk does computations in stable homotopy localized at the Morava K-theory .

Besides the work on the homotopy groups of spheres and related spaces, he did important work on Thom spectra. This work was used heavily in the proof of the nilpotence theorem by Ethan Devinatz, Michael J. Hopkins, and Jeffrey Smith.

Awards and honors
In 1998 he was an Invited Speaker of the International Congress of Mathematicians in Berlin. In 2012 he became a fellow of the American Mathematical Society.

Selected publications
Mark E. Mahowald and Martin C. Tangora, Some differentials in the Adams spectral sequence, Topology 6 (1967) 349–369.  
Michael G. Barratt, Mark E. Mahowald, and Martin C. Tangora, Some differentials in the Adams spectral sequence II, Topology 9 (1970) 309–316.  
Stanley O. Kochman and Mark E. Mahowald, On the computation of stable stems in The Čech centennial: a Conference on Homotopy Theory, June 22–26, 1993, pp. 299–316. 
Paul Goerss, Hans-Werner Henn, Mark E. Mahowald, and Charles Rezk, A resolution of the K(2)-local sphere at the prime 3, Annals of Mathematics 162 (2005), 777–822. 
Prasit Bhattacharya, Philip Egger and Mark E. Mahowald, On the periodic v2-self-map of A1, Algebraic and Geometric Topology 17 (2017) 657–692. doi:10.2140/agt.2017.17.657

References

External links 

Homepage at Northwestern University
 (294 kB)

1931 births
20th-century American mathematicians
21st-century American mathematicians
University of Minnesota alumni
Northwestern University faculty
Fellows of the American Mathematical Society
2013 deaths
People from Albany, Minnesota
Mathematicians from Minnesota
Topologists
Syracuse University faculty